John Michael Lamb (born July 10, 1990) is an American former professional baseball pitcher. He played in Major League Baseball (MLB) for the Cincinnati Reds and Los Angeles Angels. Lamb is the grandson of John Ramsey, the former Public Address announcer at Dodger Stadium.

Career

Kansas City Royals
Lamb attended Laguna Hills High School in Laguna Hills, California. The Kansas City Royals selected Lamb in the fifth round of the 2008 Major League Baseball Draft. He signed with the Royals, receiving a $165,000 signing bonus. In 2010, Lamb won the Paul Splittorff Award as the best minor league pitcher in the Royals' system. Prior to the 2011 season, Lamb was rated the 18th best prospect in baseball by Baseball America. He underwent Tommy John surgery to repair an ulnar collateral ligament in June 2011. The Royals added him to their 40-man roster after the 2012 season.

Lamb pitched for the Wilmington Blue Rocks of the Class A-Advanced Carolina League in 2013. He joined the Omaha Storm Chasers of the Class AAA Pacific Coast League in 2014. The Royals promoted Lamb to the major leagues on July 17, 2015. He was optioned back to the minor leagues without making his major league debut.

Cincinnati Reds
On July 26, 2015, the Royals traded Lamb to the Cincinnati Reds, along with Brandon Finnegan and Cody Reed, for Johnny Cueto. After making three starts for the Louisville Bats of the Class AAA International League, the Reds promoted Lamb to make his major league debut on August 14.

Lamb underwent back surgery during the 2015–16 offseason, and began of the regular season on the disabled list. The Reds activated Lamb from the disabled list to make his season debut on May 3. He was then optioned to Triple A Louisville. Then on June 25 he was recalled from Louisville to make a start later that day against the San Diego Padres. During his two seasons in Cincinnati, Lamb went 2-12 with a 6.17 ERA. He was designated for assignment on October 28. The Tampa Bay Rays acquired Lamb from the Cincinnati Reds on November 2, 2016, in exchange for cash considerations. On November 18, the Rays released Lamb.

Los Angeles Angels
Lamb signed a minor league contract with the Los Angeles Angels of Anaheim on December 2, 2016. He began the 2017 season recovering from back surgery. On May 9, he was suspended 50 games for a second positive test. He elected free agency on November 6, 2017. On January 23, 2018, Lamb resigned a minor league deal with the Angels. They promoted him to the major leagues on June 16. On June 30, it was announced that Lamb would undergo season ending Tommy John surgery, ending his 2018 season and possibly all of 2019. He was outrighted to the minors on November 1, 2018 and became a free agent the next day.

References

External links

1990 births
Living people
Sportspeople from Orange County, California
Baseball players from California
Major League Baseball pitchers
Cincinnati Reds players
Los Angeles Angels players
Idaho Falls Chukars players
Burlington Royals players
Burlington Bees players
Wilmington Blue Rocks players
Northwest Arkansas Naturals players
Omaha Storm Chasers players
Arizona League Royals players
Louisville Bats players
People from La Palma, California
Salt Lake Bees players